Feliciano João Jone (born 15 November 1996), commonly known as Nené, is a Mozambican footballer who plays as a midfielder for CD Costa do Sol and the Mozambique national football team.

Career

International
Nené made his senior international debut on 28 June 2017, coming on as a 71st-minute substitute for Nuno in a 2-1 victory over Seychelles at the 2017 COSAFA Cup.

Career statistics

International

Honors

Club
Costa do Sol
Moçambola Champion: 2019

References

External links

1996 births
Living people
CD Costa do Sol players
Moçambola players
Mozambican footballers
Mozambique international footballers
Association football midfielders
GDR Textáfrica players
People from Manica Province
Mozambique A' international footballers
2022 African Nations Championship players